Confidence is a state of being clear-headed: either that a hypothesis or prediction is correct, or that a chosen course of action is the best or most effective. Confidence comes from a Latin word 'fidere' which means "to trust"; therefore, having self-confidence is having trust in one's self. Arrogance or hubris, in comparison, is the state of having unmerited confidence—believing something or someone is correct or capable, when evidence or reasons for this belief are lacking. Overconfidence or presumptuousness is excessive belief in someone (or something) succeeding, without any regard for failure. Confidence can be a self-fulfilling prophecy, as those without it may fail or not try because they lack it, and those with it may succeed because they have it rather than because of an innate ability.

The concept of self-confidence is commonly defined as self-assurance in one's personal judgment, ability, power, etc. One's self-confidence often increases as a result of experiences of having satisfactorily completed particular activities. Self-confidence involves a positive belief that one can generally accomplish what one wishes to doin the future. Self-confidence is not the same as self-esteem, which is an evaluation of one's own worth. Self-confidence is more specifically trust in one's ability to achieve some goal, which one meta-analysis suggested is similar to generalization of self-efficacy. Abraham Maslow and many others after him have emphasized the need to distinguish between self-confidence as a generalized personality characteristic, and self-confidence with respect to a specific task, ability or challenge (i.e. self-efficacy). Self-confidence typically refers to general self-confidence. This is different from self-efficacy, which psychologist Albert Bandura has defined as a "belief in one's ability to succeed in specific situations or accomplish a task" and therefore is the term that more accurately refers to specific self-confidence. Psychologists have long noted that a person can possess self-confidence in their ability to complete a specific task (self-efficacy) (e.g. cook a good meal or write a good novel) even though they may lack general self-confidence, or conversely be self-confident though they lack the self-efficacy to achieve a particular task (e.g. write a novel). These two types of self-confidence are, however, correlated with each other, and for this reason can be easily conflated.

History 
Ideas about the causes and effects of self-confidence have appeared in English language publications describing characteristics of a sacrilegious attitude toward God, the character of the British empire, and the culture of colonial-era American society (where it seemed to connote arrogance and be a negative attribute).

In 1890, the philosopher William James in his Principles of Psychology wrote, "Believe what is in the line of your needs, for only by such belief is the need fulfilled ... Have faith that you can successfully make it, and your feet are nerved to its accomplishment," expressing how self-confidence could be a virtue. That same year, Dr. Frederick Needham, in his presidential address to the opening of the British Medical Journals Section of Psychology praised a progressive new architecture of an asylum accommodation for insane patients as increasing their self-confidence by offering them greater "liberty of action, extended exercise, and occupation, thus generating self-confidence and becoming, not only excellent tests of the sanity of the patient, but operating powerfully in promoting recovery."

With the arrival of World War I, psychologists praised self-confidence as greatly decreasing nervous tension, allaying fear, and ridding the battlefield of terror; they argued that soldiers who cultivated a strong and healthy body would also acquire greater self-confidence while fighting. At the height of the Temperance social reform movement of the 1920s, psychologists associated self-confidence in men with remaining at home and taking care of the family when they were not working. During the Great Depression, Philip Eisenberg and Paul Lazerfeld noted how a sudden negative change in one's circumstances, especially a loss of a job, could lead to decreased self-confidence, but more commonly if the jobless person believes the fault of his unemployment is his. They also noted how if individuals do not have a job long enough, they became apathetic and lost all self-confidence.

In 1943, Abraham Maslow in his paper "A Theory of Human Motivation" argued that an individual is only motivated to acquire self-confidence (one component of "esteem") after achieving what they need for physiological survival, safety, and love and belonging. He claimed that satisfaction of self-esteem led to feelings of self-confidence that, once attained, led to a desire for "self-actualization." As material standards of most people rapidly rose in developed countries after World War II and fulfilled their material needs, a plethora of widely cited academic research about-confidence and many related concepts like self-esteem and self-efficacy emerged.

Theories and correlations with other variables and factors

Self-confidence as an intra-psychological variable 
Social psychologists have found self-confidence to be correlated with other psychological variables within individuals, including saving money, influencing others, and being a responsible student. Marketing researchers have found that general self-confidence of a person is negatively correlated with their level of anxiety.

Some studies suggest various factors within and beyond an individual's control that affect their self-confidence. Hippel and Trivers propose that people will deceive themselves about their own positive qualities and negative qualities of others so that they can display greater self-confidence than they might otherwise feel, thereby enabling them to advance socially and materially. Others have found that new information about an individual's performance interacts with an individual's prior self-confidence about their ability to perform. If that particular information is negative feedback, this may interact with a negative affective state (low self-confidence) causing the individual to become demoralized, which in turn induces a self-defeating attitude that increases the likelihood of failure in the future more than if they did not lack self-confidence. On the other hand, some also find that self-confidence increases a person's general well-being and one's motivation and therefore often performance. It also increases one's ability to deal with stress and mental health.

A meta-analysis of 12 articles found that generally when individuals attribute their success to a stable cause (a matter under their control) they are less likely to be confident about being successful in the future. If an individual attributes their failure to an unstable cause (a factor beyond their control, like a sudden and unexpected storm) they are more likely to be confident about succeeding in the future. Therefore, if an individual believes they and/or others failed to achieve a goal (e.g. give up smoking) because of a factor that was beyond their control, they are more likely to be more self-confident that they can achieve the goal in the future. Whether a person in making a decision seeks out additional sources of information depends on their level of self-confidence specific to that area. As the complexity of a decision increases, a person is more likely to be influenced by another person and seek out additional information. However, people can also be relatively self-confident about what they believe if they consult sources of information that agree with their world views (e.g. New York Times for liberals, Fox News for conservatives), even if they do not know what will happen tomorrow. Several psychologists suggest that people who are self-confident are more willing to examine evidence that both supports and contradicts their attitudes. Meanwhile, people who are less self-confident about their perspective and are more defensive about them may prefer proattitudinal information over materials that challenge their perspectives. (see also Byrne, 1961; Olson & Zanna, 1982b; for related views in other domains, see Tesser, 2001).

Relationship to social influences 
An individual's self-confidence can vary in different environments, such as at home or in school, and with respect to different types of relationships and situations. In relation to general society, some have found that the more self-confident an individual is, the less likely they are to conform to the judgments of others. Leon Festinger found that self-confidence in an individual's ability may only rise or fall where that individual is able to compare themselves to others who are roughly similar in a competitive environment. Furthermore, when individuals with low self-confidence receive feedback from others, they are averse to receiving information about their relative ability and negative informative feedback, and not averse to receiving positive feedback.

People with high self-confidence can easily impress others, as others perceive them as more knowledgeable and more likely to make correct judgments, despite the fact that often a negative correlation is sometimes found between the level of their self-confidence and accuracy of their claims. When people are uncertain and unknowledgeable about a topic, they are more likely to believe the testimony, and follow the advice of those that seem self-confident. However, expert psychological testimony on the factors that influence eyewitness memory appears to reduce juror reliance on self-confidence.

People prefer leaders with greater self-confidence over those with less self-confidence. Heterosexual men who exhibit greater self-confidence relative to other men more easily attract single and partnered women. Salespeople who are high in self-confidence tend to set higher goals for themselves, which makes them more likely to stay employed, yield higher revenues, and generate higher customer service satisfaction. Self-confident leaders tend to influence others through persuasion instead of resorting to coercive means. They are more likely to resolve issues by referring them to another qualified person or calling upon bureaucratic procedures (organizational policies, regulations, etc.), which avoid personal involvement. Others suggest that self-confidence does not affect leadership style but is only correlated with years of supervisory experience and self-perceptions of power.

Variation in different categorical groups 
Social scientists have discovered that self-confidence operates differently in different categories of people.

Children 
Zimmerman claimed that if children are self-confident they can learn they are more likely to sacrifice immediate recreational time for possible rewards in the future, enhancing their self-regulative capability. By adolescence, youth that have little contact with friends tend to have low self-confidence. Successful performance of children in music also increases feelings of self-confidence, increasing motivation for study.

In children, self-confidence emerges differently than adults. For example, Fenton suggested that only children as a group are more self-confident than other children.

Students 

Many students focus on studies in school. In general, students who perform well have increased confidence which likely in turn encourages students to take greater responsibility to successfully complete tasks. Students who perform better receive more positive evaluation reports and greater self-confidence. Low achieving students report less confidence and high performing students report higher self-confidence.

Extracurricular activities can boost confidence in students at earlier age only in school. These include participating in games/sports, visual and performing arts, and public-speaking among others.

Teachers can greatly affect the self-confidence of their students depending on how they treat them. In particular, Steele and Aronson established that black students perform more poorly on exams (relative to white students) if they must reveal their racial identities before the exam, a phenomenon known as "stereotype threat." Keller and Dauenheimer find a similar phenomenon in relation to female student's performance (relative to male student's) on math tests. Sociologists of education Zhou and Lee have observed the reverse phenomenon occurring amongst Asian-Americans, whose confidence becomes tied up in expectations that they will succeed by both parents and teachers and who claim others perceive them as excelling academically more than they in fact are.

In one study of UCLA students, males (compared to females) and adolescents with more siblings (compared to those with less) were more self-confident. Individuals who were self-confident specifically in the academic domain were more likely to be happy but higher general self-confidence was not correlated with happiness. With greater anxiety, shyness and depression, emotionally vulnerable students feel more lonely due to a lack of general self-confidence. Another study of first year college students found men to be much more self-confident than women in athletic and academic activities. In regards to inter-ethnic interaction and language learning, studies show that those who engage more with people of a different ethnicity and language become more self-confident in interacting with them.

Men versus women 
Barber and Odean find that male common stock investors trade 45% more than their female counterparts, which they attribute to greater recklessness (though also self-confidence) of men, reducing men's net returns by 2.65 percentage points per year versus women's 1.72 percentage points.

Some have found that women who are either high or low in general self-confidence are more likely to be persuaded to change their opinion than women with medium self-confidence. However, when specific high confidence (self-efficacy) is high, generalized confidence plays less of a role in affecting their ability to carry out the task. Research finds that females report self-confidence levels in supervising subordinates proportionate to their experience level, while males report being able to supervise subordinates well regardless of experience.

Evidence also has suggested that women who are more self-confident may receive high performance evaluations but not be as well liked as men that engage in the same behavior. However confident women were considered a better job candidates than both men and women who behaved modestly.
In the aftermath of the first wave of feminism and women's role in the labor force during the World War, Maslow argued that some women who possessed a more "dominant" personality were more self-confident and therefore would aspire to and achieve more intellectually than those that had a less "dominant" personality—even if they had the same level of intelligence as the "less dominant" women. However, Phillip Eisenberg later found the same dynamic among men.

Another common finding is that males who have low generalized self-confidence are more easily persuaded than males of high generalized self-confidence. Women tend to respond less to negative feedback and be more averse to negative feedback than men. Niederle and Westerlund found that men are much more competitive and obtain higher compensation than women and that this difference is due to differences in self-confidence, while risk and feedback-aversion play a negligible role. Some scholars partly attribute the fact to women being less likely to persist in engineering college than men to women's diminished sense of self-confidence.

This contrast may be related to gender roles, as one study found that women who viewed commercials with women in traditional gender roles appeared less self-confident in giving a speech than those who viewed commercials with women taking on more masculine roles. Such self-confidence may also be related to body image, as one study found a sample of overweight people in Australia and the US are less self-confident about their body's performance than people of average weight, and the difference is even greater for women than for men. Others have found that if a newborn is separated from its mother upon delivery, the mother is less self-confident in her ability to raise that child than one who was not separated from her children, even if the two mothers did not differ much in their care-taking abilities. Furthermore, women who initially had low self-confidence are likely to experience a larger drop of self-confidence after separation from their children than women with relatively higher self-confidence.

Stereotype threat 
Stereotype threat examines how a social identity that is negatively stereotyped causes vulnerabilities in a stereotype-relevant situation. This concept examines factors such as difficulty of the task while experiencing stereotype threat, beliefs about abilities, as well as the interplay of the relevance of the stereotype to the task.

Self-confidence in different cultures 
Some have suggested that self-confidence is more adaptive in cultures where people are not very concerned about maintaining harmonious relationships. But in cultures that value positive feelings and self-confidence less, maintenance of smooth interpersonal relationships are more important, and therefore self-criticism and a concern to save face is more adaptive. For example, Suh et al. (1998) argue that East Asians are not as concerned as maintaining self-confidence as Americans and many even find Asians perform better when they lack confidence.

Athletes 
Many sports psychologists have noted the importance of self-confidence in winning athletic competitions. Amongst athletes, gymnasts who tend to talk to themselves in an instructional format tended to be more self-confident than gymnasts who did not. Researchers have found that self-confidence is also one of the most influential factors in how well an athlete performs in a competition. In particular, "robust self-confidence beliefs" are correlated with aspects of "mental toughness," or the ability to cope better than your opponents with many demands and remain determined, focused and in control under pressure. In particular, Bull et al. (2005) make the distinction between "robust confidence" which leads to tough thinking, and "resilient confidence" which involves over-coming self doubts and maintaining self-focus and generates "tough thinking." These traits enable athletes to "bounce back from adversity." When athletes confront stress while playing sports, their self-confidence decreases. However feedback from their team members in the form of emotional and informational support reduces the extent to which stresses in sports reduces their self-confidence. At high levels of support, performance related stress does not affect self-confidence.

In a group, their desire for success and confidence can also be related. It was found that groups that had a higher desire for success did better in performance than the group with a weaker desire. The more frequently a group succeeded, the more interest they had for the activity and their desire for success grew. Success can influence a group to have higher goals and strive to work harder. However, it may not apply to tasks that are extrinsically motivating. However, over-confidence can cause people to load which can hinder a group's performance. Individuals with high confidence whose performance were identifiable are less likely to loaf than the individuals with less confidence within the same situation. Individuals confidence makes for a successful team performance which improves the team's confidence.

Measures 
One of the earliest measures of self-confidence used a 12-point scale centered on zero, ranging from a minimum score characterizing someone who is "timid and self-distrustful, Shy, never makes decisions, self effacing" to an upper extreme score representing someone who is "able to make decisions, absolutely confident and sure of his own decisions and opinions."

Some have measured self-confidence as a simple construct divided into affective and cognitive components: anxiety as an affective aspect and self-evaluations of proficiency as a cognitive component.

The more context-based Personal Evaluation Inventory (PEI), developed by Shrauger (1995), measures specific self-esteem and self-confidence in different aspects (speaking in public spaces, academic performance, physical appearance, romantic relationships, social interactions, athletic ability, and general self-confidence). Other surveys have also measured self-confidence in a similar way by evoking examples of more concrete activities (e.g. making new friends, keeping up with course demands, managing time wisely, etc.). The Competitive State Anxiety Inventory-2 (CSAI-2) measures on a scale of 1 to 4 how confident athletes feel about winning an upcoming match. Likewise, the Trait Robustness of Sports-Confidence Inventory (TROSCI) requires respondents to provide numerical answers on a nine-point scale answering such questions about how much one's self-confidence goes up and down, and how sensitive one's self-confidence is to performance and negative feedback.

Others, skeptical about the reliability of such self-report indices, have measured self-confidence by having examiners assess non-verbal cues of subjects, measuring on a scale of 1 to 5 whether the individual
 maintains frequent eye contact or almost completely avoids eye contact,
 engages in little or no fidgeting, or, a lot of fidgeting,
 seldom or frequently uses self-comforting gestures (e.g. stroking hair or chin, arms around self),
 sits up straight facing the experimenter, or, sits hunched over or rigidly without facing the experimenter,
 has a natural facial expression, or, grimaces,
 does not twiddle hands, or, frequently twiddles something in their hand, or,
 uses body and hand gestures to emphasize a point, or, never uses hand or body gestures to emphasize a point or makes inappropriate gestures.

Wheel of Wellness 
The Wheel of Wellness was the first theoretical model of Wellness based in counseling theory. It is a model based on Adler's individual psychology and cross-disciplinary research on characteristics of healthy people who live longer and with a higher quality of life. The Wheel of Wellness includes five life tasks that relate to each other: spirituality, self-direction, work and leisure, friendship, and love. There are 15 subtasks of self-direction areas: sense of worth, sense of control, realistic beliefs, emotional awareness and coping, problem solving and creativity, sense of humor, nutrition, exercise, self-care, stress management, gender identity, and cultural identity. There are also five second-order factors, the Creative Self, Coping Self, Social Self, Essential Self, and Physical Self, which allow exploration of the meaning of wellness within the total self. In order to achieve a high self-esteem, it is essential to focus on identifying strengths, positive assets, and resources related to each component of the Wellness model and using these strengths to cope with life challenges.

Implicit vs. explicit
Implicitly measured self-esteem has been found to be weakly correlated with explicitly measured self-esteem. Two experiments were conducted to examine implicit self-esteem by using a self-other Implicit Association Test (IAT.) Participants were asked to complete two different self-other IAT's. One esteem-IAT had the other be unspecified and one in which the other specified to be a close friend. Friend other-IAT was just a replication of unspecified other-IAT, but the specified person could be either a dating partner or a close friend of the opposite sex. The order that it was taken was first, unspecified and then specified to avoid participants from associating the specified person to the unspecified other-IAT. Afterward, participants completed an explicit measure of self-esteem through a self-semantic differential, a self-feeling thermometer, and the Rosenberg (1965) Self-Esteem Scale. There was no correlation found in the relationship between implicit and explicit measures of esteem. This leads some critics to assume that explicit and implicit self-confidence are two completely different types of self-esteem. Therefore, this has drawn the conclusion that one will either have a distinct, unconscious self-esteem OR they will consciously misrepresent how they feel about themselves. Recent studies have shown that implicit self-esteem doesn't particularly tap into the unconscious, rather that people consciously overreport their levels of self-esteem. Another possibility is that implicit measurement may be assessing a different aspect of conscious self-esteem altogether. Inaccurate self-evaluation is commonly observed in healthy populations. In the extreme, large differences between oneʼs self-perception and oneʼs actual behavior is a hallmark of a number of disorders that have important implications for understanding treatment seeking and compliance.

Extent 
Motivation theories have suggested that successful performance hinges on both skill and will. Yet, even a motivated and skilled individual can fail to perform if they do not have a personal belief that they can handle what it takes or what needs to be done. Overconfidence frequently occurs in patients with schizophrenia, which is a defining feature of delusions. Metacognitive training for psychosis (MCT) reduces delusions and hallucinations according to a meta-analysis, which is attributed to the attenuation of response confidence.

Lack of self-confidence
Self-confidence has an effect on interest and/or enthusiasm and self-regulation. Evidence says that self-confidence is the base of striving to accomplish goals and improve performance. Self-confidence is not motivation, but it plays a factor in what one perceives they are capable of performing. Low confidence makes it less likely that a person will initiate action and more likely that a person will disengage because they doubt they can handle what needs to be done. Even with skill and motivation, without confidence, goals are not likely to be met. In certain fields of medical practice patients experience lack of self-confidence during the recovery period. This is commonly referred to as DSF or "defectum sui fiducia" from the Latin etymology of lack of self-confidence. For example, this can be the case after stroke whereby the patient refrains from using the weaker lower limb due to fear of it not being strong enough to hold their weight whilst standing or walking.

The mindset that an individual has towards their goals is influenced by self-confidence. As well as "to mediate the relationship between goals intentions and motivation." Research has shown that the higher the confidence is, the higher the goals. Due to the belief that they can accomplish and are able to commit to greater goals. When people do not accomplish their goals, they are not content. Bandura (1986) predicts that people who had a higher self-confidence will become even more persistent to accomplish their goals. Whereas those who put themselves down and have doubts will lean more towards giving up quickly. Higher self-confident individuals will change their goals to cater more towards them. The lower self-confident individuals will "become discouraged and abandon their goal altogether."

Kavanagh and Hausfeld (1986) reported that "induced moods" did not change the expectation of their confidence.

However, Bandura (1988) has argued that individuals perceived confidence indicates capability rather than their "physiological arousal condition." It is in their mind, if people do not believe that they are capable of coping then they experience disruption which lowers their confidence about their performance. Research shows evidence that anxiety symptoms is not related to the "frightful cognition," but due to the individual's self-confidence to manage them.

Confidence bias

There are several debates concerning the overconfidence phenomenon and what its source is. It is suggested that the confidence bias can be explained by a noisy conversion of objective evidence (observation) into subjective estimates (judgment), whereas noise is defined as the mixing of memories during the storing (observing/learning) and retrieval process (remembering/judgment). The information-theoretic logic behind this explanation is very similar to the mechanism that can also lead to the conservatism bias, and holds that we mix true and false evidence during storage and retrieval of evidence to and from our memories. The confidence bias results because as judges we "look inside our own memory" (evaluate our confidence) and find evidence that is more extreme than when we retrieve evidence for our judgements (which are conservative due to mixing of extreme values during retrieval). This explanation is very simple and straightforward, but nevertheless sufficient mechanism to generate both, overconfidence (in situations where judges are very sure) and underconfidence (in cases when judges openly state to lack the required knowledge).

Others have described evolutionary models which explain that "counterintuitively, overconfidence maximizes individual fitness and populations tend to become overconfident, as long as benefits from contested resources are sufficiently large compared with the cost of competition".

See also

 Grandiose delusions
 Haughtiness
 Hubris
 Icarus complex
 Narcissism
 Self-serving bias
 Vanity

References

Emotions
Narcissism
Positive psychology

eo:Fido
fi:Luottamus